was a Japanese composer and performer.  He is best known for his scores for the avant-garde films by Maya Deren.

Early life
Ito was born in Tokyo, Japan to a theatrical family. His mother, Teiko Ono, was a dancer and his father, Yuji Ito, was a designer and composer. His family moved to the United States when he was six. Ito accompanied his mother's dance performance at the American Museum of Natural History in New York City; he performed for both Japanese and Korean dance. At 15, he ran away from home. He began to compose at age 17. He met Maya Deren during this time and in 1955, traveled with her to Haiti. There, Ito studied under a master drummer. Ito would also compose the score for Deren's Meshes of the Afternoon at Deren's request. Ito married Deren in 1960 and remained married to her until her death in 1961.

The Japanese American actor Jerry Ito (1927–2007) was Teiji Ito's first cousin.

Career
Ito won an Obie Award for his scores during the 1960-1961 off-Broadway season; the productions included Brecht's In the Jungle of Cities, King Ubu, and Three Modern Japanese Plays. In 1963, he composed the score for the Broadway production of One Flew Over the Cuckoo's Nest. Ito wrote Watermill which was first performed by the New York City Ballet in 1971. Ito also performed and composed for Jean Erdman's Theater of the Open Eye.

Ito and his fourth wife, Cherel, edited Deren's 1947-1951 footage she shot while in Haiti; this would result in the documentary Divine Horsemen: The Living Gods of Haiti.

Death
While in Haiti, Ito died of a heart attack in 1982.

Discography
Meshes: Music For Films and Theater (O.O. Discs)
Music For Maya: Early Film Music Of Teiji Ito (Tzadik Records, 2-CD set)
King Ubu (Tzadik)
The Shamanic Principles (Tzadik)
Tenno (Tzadik)
Watermill (Tzadik)

References

External links

Teiji Ito  Tzadik discs
The Teiji Ito papers in the Music Division of The New York Public Library for the Performing Arts
Collection of noncommercial recordings from The New York Public Library for the Performing Arts

1935 births
1982 deaths
20th-century American composers
20th-century American drummers
20th-century American male musicians
20th-century classical composers
20th-century Japanese composers
20th-century Japanese male musicians
American classical composers
American classical musicians
American contemporary classical composers
American film score composers
American male classical composers
American male drummers
American male film score composers
American multi-instrumentalists
American musical theatre composers
Avant-garde musicians
Ballet composers
Contemporary classical music performers
Experimental composers
Haitian classical musicians
Haitian drummers
Japanese classical composers
Japanese classical musicians
Japanese contemporary classical composers
Japanese drummers
Japanese expatriates in Haiti
Japanese expatriates in the United States
Japanese film score composers
Japanese male classical composers
Japanese multi-instrumentalists
Japanese musical theatre composers
Male musical theatre composers
Musicians from New York City
Musicians from Tokyo
Obie Award recipients
Tzadik Records artists